Dave Thor (born February 20, 1947) is an American gymnast. He competed in eight events at the 1968 Summer Olympics.

References

External links
 

1947 births
Living people
American male artistic gymnasts
Olympic gymnasts of the United States
Gymnasts at the 1968 Summer Olympics
Gymnasts from Los Angeles
Pan American Games medalists in gymnastics
Pan American Games gold medalists for the United States
Pan American Games bronze medalists for the United States
Gymnasts at the 1967 Pan American Games